Malta Rugby League (MRL) is the governing body for the sport of rugby league football in Malta. The board was formed in 2008.

The MRL is an Affiliate Member of the Rugby League European Federation (RLEF) and recognised by the Rugby League International Federation (RLIF). The MRL is also a member of the Kunsill Malti ghall-iSport (KMS) - the national organisation responsible for supporting, developing and promoting sport throughout Malta and Gozo.

See also

 Rugby league in Malta
 Malta national rugby league team

References

External links

Rugby league governing bodies in Europe
Rugby league in Malta
Rugby League
2008 establishments in Malta
Sports organizations established in 2008